Lux Perpetua (Latin, 'eternal light') may refer to:

 a phrase from the Christian prayer Requiem Æternam
 Light Perpetual, a 2006 historical fantasy novel by Andrzej Sapkowski
 Lux Perpetua (band), a Polish power metal band

See also
 Eternal light (disambiguation)
 Perpetua (disambiguation)
 Lux Aeterna (disambiguation)